Worms Forts: Under Siege is a 3D artillery tactical game developed by Team17. A follow up to the previous Worms game, Worms 3D, Forts showcases new features. While the primary method of victory is to destroy the opposing team, victory can also be achieved by destroying the opposing "Stronghold", the most important building in the game.

Gameplay 
In Worms Forts: Under Siege, the gameplay follows a similar structure to the main Worms series games, except players can construct fortifications that can strengthen the defensive potential of either team. Each player takes turns to construct fortifications and/or make an attack. Players can build a variety of these fortifications, which in return offer special bonuses that improve the defense of their own teams. Forts have to be constructed so that they are connected to a singular large fortification called the "Stronghold". A variety of forts are progressively unlocked based on players' performance on expanding fortifications across the land from the Stronghold via a network-like system. As the game progresses, the player can construct increasingly larger forts that are capable of deploying stronger weapons, or construct special buildings that provide special gameplay benefits, such as the generation of collectible health crates or weapon crates. Players can fire from special forts designed to deploy stronger siege weapons, compared to basic weapons such as the Grenade or Bazooka.

At the start of each game, each player starts with a "Stronghold", a large fortification with high health. Weapons are used to destroy buildings and their links. Isolated forts that have lost all links to the Stronghold are immediately destroyed. Destroying the Stronghold immediately destroys all forts and subsequently forces the associated team to forfeit. The player wins by defeating the opposing team(s), achieved by either killing all their worms or destroying their strongholds.

Stories 
Egyptian: The Egyptian story focuses on a worm called Seth, who tries to raise an army of the dead to battle the Pharaoh.

Greek: The Greek story focuses on the war against Troy and a worm called Helen.

Oriental: The Oriental story focuses on the Mongol invasions, with names beginning with Rise of and Fall of. The last map shows a destroyed Mongol ship, a reference to the tsunami which destroyed the Mongol fleets.

Medieval: The Medieval story focuses on King Arthur and how he became king. The last map is called "Mordred and Morgana", a reference to the last battle, in which Arthur was fatally wounded.

Reception

Worms Forts: Under Siege was met with mixed reviews. Aggregating review websites GameRankings and Metacritic gave the PC version 59.75% and 60/100, the PlayStation 2 version 64.69% and 63/100 and the Xbox version 67.72% and 67/100.

References

External links
 Official game website
 
 Worms Forts: Under Siege at MobyGames

2004 video games
Artillery video games
PlayStation 2 games
Sega video games
Strategy video games
Video games developed in the United Kingdom
Video games scored by Bjørn Lynne
Windows games
 06
Xbox games